Nakayama Station may refer to either of the following railway stations in Japan:

 Nakayama Station (Kanagawa), on the Yokohama Line and the Yokohama Subway Green Line
 Nakayama Station (Kochi), on the Tosa Electric Railway Ino Line
 Baraki-Nakayama Station, on the Tokyo Metro Tozai Line
 Iyo-Nakayama Station, on the Yosan Line
 Keisei Nakayama Station, on the Keisei Main Line
 Shimousa-Nakayama Station, on the Sobu Main Line
 Uzen-Nakayama Station, on the Ou Line

It may also refer to:
 Nakayama-kannon Station, on the Hankyu Takarazuka Line (formerly named Nakayama Station)
 Nakayamadera Station, on the Fukuchiyama Line (formerly named Nakayama Station)

See Also
 Zhongshan Station (disambiguation)
 Zhongshan Park Station (disambiguation)
 Zhongshan (disambiguation)